Oy-Pozhum (Oj Požym) is a rural locality (a village) in Kochyovskoye Rural Settlement, Kochyovsky District, Perm Krai, Russia. The population was 39 as of 2010. There are 6 streets.

Geography 
Oy-Pozhum is located 12 km northwest of Kochyovo (the district's administrative centre) by road. Lyagayevo is the nearest rural locality.

References 

Rural localities in Kochyovsky District